Bradley Caleb Kane (born September 29, 1973) is an American actor, singer, producer and screenwriter.

Career
Kane began to act with a small role in the movie Six Weeks.  At the age of eight, he obtained the role of one of the four chorus boys in the Broadway musical Evita. He was in that production for four months before changing to the pre-Broadway workshop of Stephen Sondheim's Sunday in the Park with George, in which he acted alongside such stars as Bernadette Peters and Mandy Patinkin. When he was eleven, Kane participated in the "Very Special Arts" festival, a series of benefit concerts for disabled children's charities, which gave him an opportunity to sing for then First Lady Nancy Reagan in the White House and at the Kennedy Center.

Kane has appeared in many commercials and programs such as Law & Order, One Life to Live, Guiding Light, Search for Tomorrow, and Plaza Sésamo. He has also been a host on the Nickelodeon series Rated K Update and has been the assistant conductor of an interview program called Girl Talk. In theatre, his credits include the role of the young Lucius in the Public Theater's production of Titus Andronicus, and two roles in James Lapine's Lincoln Center production of The Winter's Tale. He provided the singing voice of the character Aladdin, opposite Lea Salonga (Jasmine), in the 1992 film of the same name, as well as its sequels. In 1993, Kane teamed up again with Salonga to do a live version of "A Whole New World", the hit song from Aladdin, at the 65th Academy Awards.

In 1993, he played Arpad Laszlo in the Broadway revival of She Loves Me.  He also played Tucker Wells in the season three episode "The Prom" of Buffy the Vampire Slayer, and provided Jonathan Levinson's singing voice in the episode "Superstar". On September 11, 2005, Kane was invited to a ceremony at Hong Kong Disneyland, the night before the theme park's opening. He performed the song "A Whole New World" from Aladdin with Cantopop star Joey Yung. As Caleb Kane, he released the song "This Close", which was played on the movie Devil's Pond. Then in 2004, he released his website with a message board to promote his album This Day in History with the first single "Go Mad" released in March 2006. Caleb has two versions of the video of this single and also another promotional video for "In Your Own Way", a song that was played on the show The Black Donnellys.

His first album, This Day in History, was released on July 1, 2008. In Fall 2008, he joined the FOX science-fiction series Fringe as a writer and co-producer. After the completion of the second season, he left the show. He co-wrote the episodes: "The Cure" (co-written by co-executive producer Felicia D. Henderson), "The No-Brainer" (co-written by co-executive producer David H. Goodman), and "Inner Child" (co-written with Julia Cho). On June 7, 2011, it was announced that he was involved with the aborted reboot of Daredevil. Since 2014 Kane is a producer on Black Sails.

In 2018, Kane released a collection of ten songs on his Soundcloud site called NEGATIVE PICKUP. The project was abandoned by Kane, only releasing three songs. He has since retired from recording music professionally.

Personal life
Kane has been married to actress Sarah Thompson since July 28, 2007; together they have two daughters.

Filmography

Film
 Six Weeks (1982) – Nutcracker Dancer (uncredited)
 The Flamingo Kid (1984) – Mitch
 Aladdin (1992) – Aladdin (singing voice)
 The Return of Jafar (1994) – Aladdin (singing voice)
 Aladdin and the King of Thieves (1996) – Aladdin (singing voice)
 Christmas in Cartoontown (1996) – Jack, Pinocchio, Singing Elf
 Starship Troopers (1997) – Lanny
 The Adventures of Tom Thumb and Thumbelina (2002) - Tom Thumb (singing voice)

Television
 ABC Funfit (1985) – Funfit Kid
 Sunday in the Park with George (1986)
 If It's Tuesday, It Still Must Be Belgium (1987)
 Rated K Update (1988) – Host
 Law & Order (1991) – Buzz Collins
 Olsen Twins Mother's Day Special (1993)
 Audubon's Animal Adventures (1996) - Narrator
 Tales from the Wild: Cain the Coyote (1998) – Narrator
 Buffy the Vampire Slayer (1999) – Season 3 Episode 20 The Prom - Tucker Wells
 Buffy the Vampire Slayer (2000) - Season 4 Episode 17 Superstar - Jonathan Levinson (Singing Voice)
 Penn Zero: Part-Time Hero (2017) – Handsome Grinkon

Video games
 Aladdin: Activity Center (1994) – Aladdin (singing voice)
 Disney's Aladdin in Nasira's Revenge (2001) – Aladdin (singing voice)

Production credits

Producer
 Crash (2008–2009)
 Fringe (2008–2009)
 Black Sails (2014–2017)
 Lodge 49 (2018)

Writer
 Crash (2008–2009)
 Fringe (2008–2009)
 Black Sails (2014–2017)
 Lodge 49 (2018)
 Warrior (2019)
 Tokyo Vice (2022)

Discography

Albums
 Classic by The Misconceptions (Brad's College band) (1993)
 This Day in History (July 1, 2008)
 Negative Pickup (2018)

Digital albums
 "Go Mad"
 "In Your Own Way"
 Selections

Other albums
 The Artist Lounge Album
 Ahead of the Curve (EP)

References

External links
 
 
 Audio Interview

1973 births
21st-century American singers
21st-century American male singers
Living people
American male television actors
American male child actors
American male film actors
American screenwriters
American male television writers
American television producers
Male actors from New Rochelle, New York
Musicians from New Rochelle, New York
Disney people